Pablo Virgilio Siongco David (born March 2, 1959), also known as "Bishop Ambo", is a Filipino prelate of the Catholic Church. He is the current bishop of the Diocese of Kalookan and is the president of the Catholic Bishops' Conference of the Philippines (CBCP).

Early life and education
Pablo Virgilio David was born in Betis, Guagua, Pampanga on March 2, 1959. He is the 10th of the 13 children of Pedro David and Bienvenida Siongco. He attended Mother of Good Counsel Minor Seminary in San Fernando, Pampanga for his secondary education. He earned his bachelor’s degree in Pre-Divinity from Ateneo de Manila University, his master’s degree in Theology from the Loyola School of Theology, and both his licentiate and doctorate in Sacred Theology from the Catholic University of Louvain in Belgium.

He has also trained at the École Biblique et Archeologique Française de Jerusalem, and is now considered one of the country’s leading Bible experts.

Ministry
David was ordained a priest in March 12, 1983, in the Roman Catholic Archdiocese of San Fernando (in Pampanga) by Archbishop Oscar Cruz and on May 26, 2006, was appointed by Pope Benedict XVI to be auxiliary bishop of San Fernando and  titular bishop of the Diocese of Guardialfiera. He was consecrated as a bishop by Gaudencio Borbon Cardinal Rosales, Archbishop of Manila, with Paciano Aniceto, Archbishop of San Fernando, and Angel Lagdameo, Archbishop of Jaro, as co-consecrators. He became Bishop of Kalookan in January 2016.

He is hugely involved in the Catholic Bishops' Conference of the Philippines (CBCP); having been a member of the CBCP's Episcopal Commission on Biblical Apostolate and one of the five bishops sent by the organization to participate in the 2008 Synod of Bishops on the Word of God in the Vatican.

David is noted for being a critic of President Rodrigo Duterte's war on drugs. On July 19, 2019, the PNP–Criminal Investigation and Detection Group (CIDG) filed charges against David, fellow bishops Honesto Ongtioco and Socrates Villegas, and members of the opposition for "sedition, cyber libel, libel, estafa, harboring a criminal, and obstruction of justice".

David was elected as President of the CBCP by its 130 members on July 8, 2021, at the start of a two-day plenary assembly. He had been the Vice President of the CBCP from 2017 until 2021, and has succeeded from former President Romulo Valles on December 1, 2021.

References

External links 

 Bishop Pablo Virgilio Siongco David profile by Catholic-Hierarchy.org

20th-century Roman Catholic bishops in the Philippines
21st-century Roman Catholic archbishops in the Philippines
Living people
Roman Catholic bishops of San Fernando
1959 births
People from Pampanga
Ateneo de Manila University alumni
Filipino Roman Catholic bishops
Roman Catholic titular bishops
Roman Catholic bishops of Kalookan
Presidents of the Catholic Bishops' Conference of the Philippines